Mike Crum (born in Dallas, Texas on December 10, 1973) was ranked as one of the best skateboarders in the world. He is a vert ramp rider and has contributed to the skateboarding industry in many ways including trick invention, endemic entrepreneurship, signature boards, signature shoes and film/media appearances.

References

External links 
Crum's Production Company
Crum's Skate Shop
EXPN profile

1973 births
Living people
American skateboarders